Cameraria umbellulariae is a moth of the family Gracillariidae. It is known from California, United States.

The wingspan is about 9 mm.

The larvae feed on Umbellularia californica. They mine the leaves of their host plant. The mine has the form of a large diffused blister-like mine on the upperside of the leaves. The pupa is enclosed in a semi-transparent flat oval silken web, within the mine.

References

Cameraria (moth)
Moths of North America
Lepidoptera of the United States
Fauna of California
Moths described in 1889
Taxa named by Thomas de Grey, 6th Baron Walsingham